Daniel Bruce (born January 14, 1999) is a Canadian curler originally from Corner Brook, Newfoundland and Labrador. He currently plays third on Team Ryan McNeil Lamswood.

Career
Bruce competed in three Canadian Junior Curling Championships in his junior career in 2018, 2019 and 2020. His best result came in 2020 skipping his own team of Ryan McNeil Lamswood at third, Joel Krats at second and Nathan King at lead. The team finished the round robin and championship pool with an 8–2 record, which qualified them for the playoffs. They defeated Rylan Kleiter of Saskatchewan in the semifinal before coming up short to Jacques Gauthier's Manitoba rink in the final. It was the first time since 2011 that Newfoundland and Labrador qualified for the playoffs. Also in his junior career, Bruce won a silver medal at the 2019 U Sports/Curling Canada University Curling Championships as third for Greg Blyde.

Out of juniors, Bruce joined the Andrew Symonds rink for the 2020–21 season. The team competed in the 2021 Newfoundland and Labrador Tankard, where they lost in a tiebreaker to Colin Thomas.

In 2021, Bruce reunited with McNeil Lamswood and King to compete for the 2021-22 season. They beat Team Nathan Young to become the team to represent the Memorial University Seahawks at the 2022 Atlantic University Sport Curling Championships. They ended up placing runner-up to the Dalhousie Tigers team. In the 2022 Newfoundland and Labrador Tankard the team failed to qualify for the play-offs; finishing with a 3-5 record.

Personal life
Bruce is currently (December 2022) a student at Memorial University of Newfoundland. He currently lives in St. John's, Newfoundland and Labrador.

Teams

References

External links

1999 births
Living people
Canadian male curlers
Curlers from Newfoundland and Labrador
Curlers from Ottawa
People from Corner Brook
Memorial University of Newfoundland alumni
Sportspeople from St. John's, Newfoundland and Labrador